A walk-on, in American and Canadian college athletics, is an athlete who becomes part of a team without being recruited and awarded an athletic scholarship.  A team's walk-on players are normally the weakest players and relegated to the scout team, and may not even be placed on the official depth chart or traveling team, while the scholarship players are the team's main players.  However, a walk-on player occasionally becomes a noted member of the team.

General parameters
Because of scholarship limits instituted by the NCAA, many football teams do not offer scholarships to their punters, long snappers and kickers until they have become established producers.
Sometimes injury or outside issues can ravage the depth chart of a particular position, resulting in the elevation of a walk-on to a featured player.
In other situations, a walk-on may so impress the coaching staff with their play on the scout team and in practice that they are rewarded with a scholarship and made a part of the regular depth chart. Often, it is the players who achieve success in this manner that are the inspiration for future walk-ons. One significant college football national award, the Burlsworth Trophy - named for the eventual All-American former walk-on offensive lineman at the University of Arkansas, Brandon Burlsworth - has been awarded since 2010 to the most outstanding player in the top-level Football Bowl Subdivision (FBS) who began his college career as a walk-on. The only two-time recipient of the Burlsworth Trophy, Baker Mayfield (2015 and 2016), won the 2017 Heisman Trophy. He began his college career as a walk-on at Texas Tech University before transferring to the University of Oklahoma, where he received all of the aforementioned awards.
Also, there are times where a walk-on will be a dependable member of the team's practice and scout teams for several years. If a team has an extra scholarship, it may award it to the player as a token of appreciation for their hard work and devotion to the team, although the player may never actually play in a game.
 Finally, in rare cases, an established scholarship player may become a walk-on in order to open up their scholarship for another player. Three such cases in men's college basketball have received notoriety in recent years:
 In 2011–12, three Louisville scholarship players, most notably Kyle Kuric and Chris Smith, became walk-ons to bring the Cardinals' scholarship totals down to the NCAA limit of 13.
 In 2013–14, Creighton's Doug McDermott (the son of Creighton's head coach) became a walk-on after a teammate was granted a rare sixth year of eligibility by the NCAA, putting the Bluejays over the 13-scholarship limit.
 In 2014–15, Xavier starting center Matt Stainbrook enrolled in the school's MBA program and gave up his scholarship for his younger brother Tim, who had been a walk-on at Xavier the year before, in order to save their family a five-figure amount in school expenses. This led him to become a driver for the on-demand car service Uber, which gained him significant notoriety during that season.

Purpose
The reasons athletes choose to pursue the path of a walk-on include:
The athlete is already receiving praise, but the school they are particularly interested in does not share the level of interest. This target team could either be considered more athletically prestigious, it may already be saturated at that position or the athlete chooses that school for purely academic reasons over others. The walk-on will join the team to try to win the coaches over.
The athlete may be a family member of a notable former player, alumnus or coach of the school. Often these players do not strive to be placed in a starting position, but rather to carry on the tradition of being a part of a particular team.
In the case of punters and kickers, there may not be a scholarship available, but the coaches may have encouraged or invited them to join the team without offering an athletic scholarship.
The athlete has not been noticed or taken seriously by recruiters. This can be the result of either not playing the respective sport while in high school or, more commonly, the prospective walk-on played the sport in high school, and perhaps even at an exceptional level, but the level of competition around the player was subpar and led scouts to dismiss the player's ability to adapt to the college game (this is often the case in rural districts where the local public school is often the only option for high school other than homeschooling). In this case, the same drawbacks that prevent the athlete from receiving the athletic scholarship may also prevent the student from even gaining admission to higher-level colleges.
In some instances, a college coach or recruiter may designate an athlete as a "preferred walk-on" during the scouting process. In this situation, the athlete is assured a spot on the team, but the coach is unable or unwilling to offer a scholarship.

In collegiate sports
Many schools that do not provide athletic scholarships still recruit student athletes, and these students can get admitted to a school with academic records that are below average for that school. The Ivy League, for example, does not permit athletic scholarships, but each school has a limited number of athletes it can recruit for each sport. Additionally, all prospective athletes are required to meet a minimum score on what the league calls the Academic Index (AI), a metric based largely on high school grade-point averages and SAT or ACT scores. The goal of the AI is to ensure that students who receive athletic admissions slots fall within one standard deviation of the credentials of the student body as a whole.

Division III athletes cannot receive athletic scholarships, but frequently get an easier ride through admissions. Even though these students do not receive athletic scholarships and are not required to play to remain in school, they are not walk-ons, because they were recruited. Instead of being awarded an athletic scholarship, they were granted an athletic admissions slot to a school to which they ordinarily would not have been likely to have gained admission.

References

College sports in the United States
American football terminology
Scholarships